The Hoogovens Wijk aan Zee Steel Chess Tournament 1985 was the 47th edition of the Wijk aan Zee Chess Tournament. It was held in Wijk aan Zee in January 1985. The tournament was won by Jan Timman.

{| class="wikitable" style="text-align: center;"
|+ 47th Hoogovens tournament, group A, 13 January – 3 February 1985, Wijk aan Zee, Netherlands, Category XIII (2555)
! !! Player !! Rating !! 1 !! 2 !! 3 !! 4 !! 5 !! 6 !! 7 !! 8 !! 9 !! 10 !! 11 !! 12 !! 13 !! 14 !! Total !! TPR !! Place
|-
|-style="background:#ccffcc;"
| 1 || align="left"| || 2650 ||  || ½ || 1 || ½ || ½ || 1 || 1 || ½ || ½ || ½ || ½ || 1 || ½ || 1 || 9 || 2689 || 1
|-
| 2 || align="left"| || 2615 || ½ ||  || 1 || ½ || ½ || 0 || 1 || ½ || 1 || ½ || ½ || ½ || ½ || 1 || 8 || 2637 || 2–3
|-
| 3 || align="left" | || 2635 || 0 || 0 ||  || ½ || ½ || 1 || ½ || 1 || ½ || 1 || ½ || ½ || 1 || 1 || 8 || 2636 || 2–3
|-
| 4 || align="left" | || 2535 || ½ || ½ || ½ ||  || ½ || ½ || 1 || ½ || 1 || 0 || ½ || ½ || 1 || ½ || 7½ || 2614 || 4
|-
| 5 || align="left" | || 2635 || ½ || ½ || ½ || ½ ||  || ½ || 0 || ½ || 1 || 0 || 1 || ½ || 1 || ½ || 7 || 2578 || 5
|-
| 6 || align="left" | || 2570 || 0 || 1 || 0 || ½ || ½ ||  || ½ || ½ || ½ || ½ || 1 || ½ || ½ || ½ || 6½ || 2554 || 6–9
|-
| 7 || align="left" | || 2505 || 0 || 0 || ½ || 0 || 1 || ½ ||  || 1 || 1 || 1 || ½ || 0 || ½ || ½ || 6½ || 2559 || 6–9
|-
| 8 || align="left" | || 2455 || ½ || ½ || 0 || ½ || ½ || ½ || 0 ||  || 0 || 1 || ½ || 1 || ½ || 1 || 6½ || 2563 || 6–9
|-
| 9 || align="left" | || 2630 || ½ || 0 || ½ || 0 || 0 || ½ || 0 || 1 ||  || ½ || 1 || 1 || 1 || ½ || 6½ || 2549 || 6–9
|-
| 10 || align="left" | || 2560 || ½ || ½ || 0 || 1 || 1 || ½ || 0 || 0 || ½ ||  || ½ || ½ || ½ || 0 || 5½ || 2498 || 10–11
|-
| 11 || align="left" | || 2545 || ½ || ½ || ½ || ½ || 0 || 0 || ½ || ½ || 0 || ½ ||  || ½ || ½ || 1 || 5½ || 2499 || 10–11 
|- 
| 12 || align="left" | || 2500 || 0 || ½ || ½ || ½ || ½ || ½ || 1 || 0 || 0 || ½ || ½ ||  || ½ || 0 || 5 || 2472 || 12–13
|-
| 13 || align="left" | || 2450 || ½ || ½ || 0 || 0 || 0 || ½ || ½ || ½ || 0 || ½ || ½ || ½ ||  || 1 || 5 || 2476 || 12–13
|-
| 14 || align="left" | || 2485 || 0 || 0 || 0 || ½ || ½ || ½ || ½ || 0 || ½ || 1 || 0 || 1 || 0 ||  || 4½ || 2450 || 14
|}

References

Tata Steel Chess Tournament
1984 in chess
1984 in Dutch sport